Presidential Residence of South Korea, commonly referred as the Yongsan Presidential Office, formerly Ministry of National Defense Building, is currently the official residence of the president of South Korea. It is located at 22 Itaewon-ro, Yongsan District, Seoul. The building was opened in November 2003, its area totalling 276,000 square meters. Following the inauguration of President Yoon Suk-yeol in May 2022, Blue House or Cheong Wa Dae, the previous presidential residence, was relieved of its duties and replaced by the current building.

See also
 Korean architecture
 History of South Korea
 Blue House
 Korea National Assembly Proceeding Hall

References

External links
Official website

Official residences in South Korea
Buildings and structures in Seoul
Buildings and structures in Yongsan District
Presidential residences
Residential buildings completed in 2003
2003 establishments in South Korea
Ministry of National Defense (South Korea)